Susanna Paasonen (born 1975, Helsinki) is a Finnish feminist scholar. She is a  Professor of Media Studies at the University of Turku, and was a visiting scholar at MIT in 2016. She gained her PhD from the University of Turku in 2002; her dissertation was on gender and the popularization of the internet, which was later published through Peter Lang. After holding positions at the universities of Tampere, Jyväskylä and Helsinki, Paasonen was appointed Professor of Media Studies at the University of Turku on 1 August 2011, and publishes on internet research, media theory, sexuality, pornography and affect.

Research 
On Monday, 4 April 2016, Paasonen gave a lecture at Brown University in the USA  on the politics and culture of online porn. In the essay, "Glimmers of the forbidden fruit: Reminiscing pornography, conceptualizing the archive," written along with Katariina Kyrölä, Paasonen traces the evolution of the "porn stash" from a physical collection to a digital one, and in doing so, examines cyberporn as a site of identity formation. She and Kyrölä suggest that pornography occasions the accumulation of a somatic archive, which are "not merely reservoirs of extra-cognitive sensation but also knowingly curated, reflected upon and reworked: they are simultaneously material and semiotic, intimate and culturally specific, affective and open to representation." In her lecture at Brown, Paasonen suggested that digital pornography must not be understood as something that creeps into society from the outside, but rather as something that already exists in contemporary culture. She writes, "Encounters with pornography therefore become incorporated as carnal capacity-- as what we can imagine our bodies enjoying and being capable of, or not enjoying and being capable of." Paasonen argues, therefore, that interactions with pornography, therefore, can contribute to the development of an individual's sexual identity.

Awards 
The Finnish Academy of Science awarded her the Jutikkala Prize of €15,000 14 October 2011. In the same year Paasonen published the book, Carnal Resonance: Affect and Online Pornography, through MIT Press. In October 2020, Paasonen, Kylie Jarrett and Ben Light won the Association of Internet Researchers' Nancy Baym Book Award for NSFW: Sex, Humor, and Risk in Social Media, published with MITP in 2019.

Bibliography

Books
 
 
 
 
 
 
 
Paasonen, Susanna (2018). Many Splendored Things: Thinking Sex and Play. London: Goldsmiths Press. .
 
 
 
Paasonen, Susanna (2021). Dependent, Distracted, Bored: Affective Formations in Networked Media. Cambridge, Massachusetts: MIT Press. ISBN 9780262045674.

Journal articles

See also

Baitbus
Cyberculture
Cyberethics
Internet pornography
Feminist theory 
Gender studies
Internet ethics

References

External links
Profile: Susanna Paasonen, Professor of Media Studies at the University of Turku.
Susanna Paasonen on Google Scholar

Living people
1975 births
University of Turku alumni
Academic staff of the University of Turku
Feminist studies scholars
Mass media scholars
Finnish ethicists
Cultural academics
Writers from Helsinki
Finnish women academics
20th-century Finnish non-fiction writers
20th-century Finnish women writers
21st-century Finnish non-fiction writers
21st-century Finnish women writers
Finnish women non-fiction writers